Morowali Regency is a regency of Central Sulawesi Province of Indonesia. It covers an area of 5,472 km2 and the districts now within the regency had a combined population of 102,228 at the 2010 Census; the regency population at the 2020 Census was 161,727; the official estimate as at mid 2021 was 167,810. The administrative centre is at the town of Bungku. The Regency includes the far-flung Menui Islands (Kepulauan Menui), lying to the southwest of the rest of the province.

History
In 1999, Morowali Regency was created out of a portion of Poso Regency. It was composed of the southeastern fourteen districts of the former Poso Regency.

In 2013 this Morowali Regency was in turn divided into two Regencies. The seven northernmost districts were split off to form a new North Morowali Regency (Morowali Utara). The seven southernmost districts were retained as the residual Morowali Regency, although two additional districts were created by the division of existing ones.

Economy 

Morowali Regency contains rich deposits of high-quality nickel, a vital material needed to manufacture lithium batteries. Starting in the 2010s and into the 2020s, the thriving nickel industry in Morowali has resulted in a large increase in the region's GDP (300% increase between 2013 and 2019), but the expansion of the extraction industry has also caused environmental degradation. From 2014 to 2020, over US$6.5 billion in foreign direct investment has flowed into the construction of nickel smelters and other downstream processing activities in Morowali Regency. Morowali is the site of an industrial park, the Morowali Industrial Park, specifically earmarked for refining activities. In Morowali, GDP more than tripled in just six years from Rp 6.9 trillion (US$480 million) in 2013 to Rp 24.3 trillion (US$1.7 billion) in 2019, almost all of it driven by investment in downstream nickel processing. As of 2021, the largest foreign investors were American, Chinese, and Japanese companies, while the government of Indonesia is attempting to build a domestic battery industry.

Administrative districts 
The Morowali Regency was divided (following the creation of the separate North Morowali Regency in 2013) into seven districts (kecamatan), but two further districts (Bungku Pesisir and Bungku Timur) were later created. These are all tabulated below with their areas and their populations at the 2010 Census and 2020 Census, together with the official estimates as at mid 2021. The table also includes the location of the district headquarters, the numbers of administrative villages (rural desa and urban kelurahan) in each district, and its postal codes.

Notes: (a) partly on Sulawesi island (and comprising the most southeastern part of the province), but also including 42 islands mainly to the southeast of the rest of the province. The largest are Menui Island and the two Padui Islands. (b) the 2010 populations of Bungku Pesisir District and Bungku Timur District are included in the figures for the Districts from which they were cut out in 2013.

References

Regencies of Central Sulawesi